Mezőszilas is a village in Fejér County, Hungary.

References

External links 
 Street map 

Populated places in Fejér County